Mezzane di Sotto is a comune (municipality) in the Province of Verona in the Italian region Veneto, located about  west of Venice and about  northeast of Verona.

Mezzane di Sotto borders the following municipalities: Illasi, Lavagno, San Martino Buon Albergo, Tregnago, and Verona.

Demographic evolution

References

Cities and towns in Veneto